The Men's omnium event of the 2007 UCI Track Cycling World Championships was held on 29 March 2007.

Results

200 m time trial

Individual pursuit

Points race

1 km time trial

Overall standings

References

External links
 Full results at Tissottiming.com

Men's omnium
UCI Track Cycling World Championships – Men's omnium